The Man at Six is a 1931 British mystery film directed by Harry Hughes and starring Anne Grey, Lester Matthews and Gerald Rawlinson. It was released in America the following year under the alternative title The Gables Mystery. It was produced by British International  Pictures at the company's Elstree Studios near London. It was based on the West End play The Man at Six by Jack Celestin and Jack DeLeon, later remade as the 1938 film The Gables Mystery.

Plot summary
A butler is found murdered in an unfurnished mansion house.

Cast
 Anne Grey as  Sybil Vane 
 Lester Matthews as Campbell Edwards 
 Gerald Rawlinson as Frank Pine 
 John Turnbull as Inspector Dawford 
 Kenneth Kove as Joshua Atkinson 
 Charles Farrell as George Wollmer 
 Arthur Stratton as Sergeant Hogan 
 Herbert Ross as Sir Joseph Pine 
 Minnie Rayner as Mrs. Cummerpatch

References

External links

1931 films
British mystery films
Films directed by Harry Hughes
British black-and-white films
1931 mystery films
Films shot at British International Pictures Studios
1930s English-language films
1930s British films
British films based on plays